The McLaren M838T engine is a  90-degree twin-turbocharged flat-plane V8, designed and developed in collaboration with Ricardo plc.

Development
McLaren bought the rights to the Tom Walkinshaw Racing developed engine, itself based on the Nissan VRH engine architecture, which was designed for the IRL Indycar championship but never raced. However, other than the  bore, little of that engine remains in the M838T. In only 18 months, Ricardo went from a modified Nissan engine design to a running prototype.

Developed with help from Ricardo, the engine redlines at 8500 rpm, but 80% of the engine's torque is available as low as 2000 rpm. McLaren claims that the engine has the highest horsepower to  emission ratio of any current production engine.

The engine is built at Ricardo's engine assembly facility in Shoreham-by-Sea, West Sussex. The turbochargers are supplied by Mitsubishi Heavy Industries (MHI), and are different units from those used in Mitsubishi Lancer Evolutions.

Applications
The engine was designed and built for the McLaren MP4-12C, where it produces  @ 7000 rpm and  @ 3000 rpm of torque. However, in 2012 McLaren released an update increasing power to  @ 7500 rpm. For the GT3 racecar, the engine produces less power at only .

McLaren and Ricardo redeveloped the M838T engine for use in the McLaren P1. The engine has been upgraded to optimise cooling and durability under higher loads. The engine block has also been modified to incorporate an integrated electric motor as part of a hybrid drive train. The petrol engine produces  at 7,200 rpm with an additional  from the electric motor.

References

External links
Official McLaren Automotive website

Engines by model
Gasoline engines by model
McLaren Group
V8 engines